Karkidaka Vavu (Malayalam: കർക്കിടക വാവ്) or ‘Karkidaka Vavu Bali’ is a set of Hindu rituals performed on a specific monsoon day in the state of Kerala, India by adherents for their deceased ancestors.

On the day of vavu or Amavasi (no moon day) people gather on the riverbanks and beaches to offer bali. Varkala Papanasam beach is also one of the major religious destinations on the day. People believe that the departed souls attain moksha (liberation) if the ritualistic homage is performed that day.

This day is also known as ‘Vavu Bali’ and is held in the month of Karkidakam in the Malayalam calendar. In the English calendar, the date falls in the month of July to August.

References

Hindu rituals related to death